"" ("Glory to the Brave People") is the national anthem of Venezuela. Its lyrics were written by physician and journalist Vicente Salias in 1810, set to music later composed by musician Juan José Landaeta. Owing to musical similarities with the French national anthem, beginning in 1840 "" was known as "" ("The Venezuelan Marseillaise"). It was declared Venezuela's national anthem by decree of President Antonio Guzmán Blanco on May 25, 1881.

Recent investigations have suggested that the real author of the anthem was Andrés Bello, and not Salias, to whom it was originally credited, and the music was composed by another musician called Lino Gallardo. However, this theory has yet to be proven, and lacks any real recognition among the general Venezuelan population, historians, or otherwise.

History 
The Patriotic Society was formed in Caracas as a result of the Revolution of April 19, 1810, One of its meetings, Existed by the Success of Its Patriotic Song, Caraqueños, Otra Época Inicia. Composed by Cayetano Carreño and Lyrics by Andrés Bello, suggested that the proposal for the Society was also launch a Patriotic March that stimulated the mood for the undecided. On April 18, 1868, newspaper El Federalista published the official lyrics written by Salias, which commemorated the 58th Anniversary of Independence the day before in the capital, mentioned that "in the halls of the University and in the presence of large public, before the speeches, a «martial music» performed several pieces, among them the National Anthem ".

Commissioned by President Guzmán Blanco, Dr. Eduardo Calcaño, a valuable composer and musician, adequately fulfilled the task of fixing the musical text of the Anthem, which he did while preserving the martial brilliance of the melody, without attempting to alter it or give it another expression.

On May 25, 1881, the Gloria al Bravo Pueblo was definitively consecrated as the National Anthem of Venezuela, by means of a decree issued by the then President, Antonio Guzmán Blanco. After this decree and the publications of the National Anthem that were made in 1883 , a new official edition was produced in 1911 to commemorate the centenary of independence, which was entrusted to Salvador Llamozas. In 1947 the current structure of the musical and lyricial ambiance was overhauled by composer Juan Bautista Plaza.

Disputed composition 
However, this theory has not been fully proven; although the truth is that both Juan José Landaeta and Lino Gallardo belonged to the "School of Music of Caracas", the central activity of the "Archdiocesan Oratory of Caracas", founded by Pedro Palacios y Sojo.

It was thus that one of the members of the Patriotic Society, poet Vicente Salias, improvised there the first verses of the National Anthem on it was originally written around 1810 as a patriotic hymn. Later official modifications have been written by Eduardo Calcaño (1881), Salvador Llamozas (1911) and Juan Bautista Plaza (1947).

Lyrics

Regulations and usage 
The official broadcast of the national anthem is played on all radio stations, national and regional television networks every day of the week at 12:00 am and 6:00 am (sometimes on 12:00 pm during National Holidays) mandatorily accorded by the law passed in 1954 (either the full version or the chorus, first stanza and chorus).

On radio broadcasts in some of the regional radio stations, the state anthem is played after the national anthem, which is also the case for state TV stations.

In most occasions, only the chorus, first stanza and the chorus are played, or even the chorus itself. Sometimes the chorus is played twice in the beginning, and once in the rest of the anthem. In formal events (if the anthem will be played by either a military band, concert band or orchestra) the format is: chorus (2x), first verse and chorus (2x), with the optional introduction. If played in full the chorus is sung twice, with or without the introductory notes.

References 
 CIA.gov

Notes

External links 

  Efemérides Venezolanas, for detailed information.
  Gloria al Bravo Pueblo (1810)
 Venezuela: Gloria al Bravo Pueblo - Audio of the national anthem of Venezuela, with information and lyrics (archive link)
 Gloria al Bravo Pueblo (short version 1987) - Orquesta Sinfónica Simón Bolivar
 Gloria al Bravo Pueblo - Presidential Honor Guard Band
 Gloria al Bravo Pueblo (ceremony version) by Orquesta Sinfónica Simón Bolivar
 Gloria al Bravo Pueblo by Orquesta Sinfónica Simón Bolivar
 vocal

National symbols of Venezuela
South American anthems
Venezuelan songs
Anthems of Venezuela
Spanish-language songs
1810 songs
1881 introductions
National anthems
National anthem compositions in F major